The Nimravinae are a subfamily of the Nimravidae, an extinct family of feliform mammalian carnivores sometimes known as false saber-toothed cats. Centered in North America, the radiation of the Nimravinae from the Eocene to Oligocene was the first radiation of cat-like carnivorans.

References 

Nimravidae
Prehistoric mammals of North America
Eocene carnivorans
Oligocene feliforms
Bartonian first appearances
Tortonian extinctions
Taxa named by Edward Drinker Cope
Fossil taxa described in 1880